Eleventh Street Methodist Episcopal Chapel, also known as the People's Home Church and Settlement, Russian Ukrainian Polish Pentecostal Church, and Father's Heart Ministry Center, is a historic Methodist Episcopal chapel located in the East Village neighborhood of Lower Manhattan, New York City. The chapel was built in 1868–1869, and is a raised two-story, three bay, gable front brick building. Originally constructed in a vernacular Gothic Revival style, it was altered between 1900 and 1901 in the Colonial Revival style.  Associated with the chapel is the former rectory.  It was built about 1856 as a four-story, three bay single family dwelling in a vernacular Greek Revival style.  The rectory was converted to a settlement house in 1900–1901.

It was listed on the National Register of Historic Places in 2011.

References

External links
Father's Heart Ministry Center website

Gothic Revival church buildings in New York City
Greek Revival houses in New York (state)
Churches completed in 1869
Churches in Manhattan
Properties of religious function on the National Register of Historic Places in Manhattan